David John Millener (born 2 May 1944) is a New Zealand physicist and former cricketer. He played first-class cricket for Auckland and Oxford University Cricket Club between 1964 and 1970.

Millener studied at the University of Auckland, then won a Rhodes Scholarship to study at St Catherine's College, Oxford, where he gained a doctorate (D.Phil.) in physics with a thesis entitled "Shell Model Studies in Light Nuclei". He then moved to work at the Brookhaven National Laboratory at Upton, New York, where he played for the Brookhaven cricket team.

See also
 List of Auckland representative cricketers
 List of Oxford University Cricket Club players

References

External links
 

1944 births
Living people
New Zealand cricketers
Auckland cricketers
Oxford University cricketers
Cricketers from Auckland
University of Auckland alumni
New Zealand Rhodes Scholars
Alumni of St Catherine's College, Oxford
New Zealand physicists
Brookhaven National Laboratory staff